Ian Patrick Sandbrook (born 22 March 1983 in Palmerston North) is a former New Zealand cricketer. He played first-class and List A cricket for Central Districts in 2007–08, and also played for Manawatu in the Hawke Cup from 2002 to 2010.

References

1983 births
Living people
Cricketers from Palmerston North
People educated at Palmerston North Boys' High School
New Zealand cricketers
Central Districts cricketers
Wicket-keepers